Moysés Kuhlmann (December 4, 1906 – January 12, 1972) was a Brazilian born botanist.

References

20th-century Brazilian botanists
1906 births
1972 deaths
Brazilian people of German descent